The Corporation Tax Act 2010 (c.4) is an Act of the Parliament of the United Kingdom that received Royal Assent on 3 March 2010.

It was first presented (first reading) in the House of Commons on 19 November 2009 and received its third reading on 4 February 2010. It was first read in the House of Lords on 4 February 2010 and received its second and third readings on 2 March 2010.

Overview
Section 1 of the Act gives a summary of the contents of the 2010 Act, and the changes it made, primarily to the Income and Corporation Taxes Act 1988.

References

External links
Corporation Tax Act 2010 on legislation.gov.uk

United Kingdom Acts of Parliament 2010
Tax legislation in the United Kingdom